Antonio Francesco Gramsci (22 January 1891 – 27 April 1937) was an Italian  Marxist philosopher, journalist, linguist, writer, and politician. He wrote on philosophy, political theory, sociology, history, and linguistics. He was a founding member and one-time leader of the Italian Communist Party. A vocal critic of Benito Mussolini and fascism, he was imprisoned in 1926 where he remained until his death in 1937. 

During his imprisonment, Gramsci wrote more than 30 notebooks and 3,000 pages of history and analysis. His Prison Notebooks are considered a highly original contribution to 20th-century political theory. Gramsci drew insights from varying sources – not only other Marxists but also thinkers such as Niccolò Machiavelli, Vilfredo Pareto, Georges Sorel, and Benedetto Croce. The notebooks cover a wide range of topics, including Italian history and nationalism, the French Revolution, fascism, Taylorism and Fordism, civil society, folklore, religion, and high and popular culture.

Gramsci is best known for his theory of cultural hegemony, which describes how the state and ruling capitalist class – the bourgeoisie – use cultural institutions to maintain power in capitalist societies. The bourgeoisie, in Gramsci's view, develops a hegemonic culture using ideology, rather than violence, economic force, or coercion. Hegemonic culture propagates its own values and norms so that they become the "common sense" values of all and thus maintain the status quo. Cultural hegemony is therefore used to maintain consent to the capitalist order, rather than the use of force to maintain order. This cultural hegemony is produced and reproduced by the dominant class through the institutions that form the superstructure.

Gramsci also attempted to break from the economic determinism of traditional Marxist thought, and so is sometimes described as a neo-Marxist. He held a humanistic understanding of Marxism, seeing it as a "philosophy of praxis" and an "absolute historicism" that transcends traditional materialism and traditional idealism.

Life

Early life 
Gramsci was born in Ales, in the province of Oristano, on the island of Sardinia, the fourth of seven sons of Francesco Gramsci (1860–1937) and Giuseppina Marcias (1861–1932). The senior Gramsci was a low-level official born in the small town of Gaeta, in the province of Latina (in the Central Italian region of Lazio), to  a well-off family from the Southern Italian regions of Campania and Calabria and of  Arbëreshë (Italo-Albanian) descent. Antonio Gramsci himself believed his father's family had left Albania as recently as 1821. The Albanian origin of his father's family is attested in the surname Gramsci, an Italianized form of Gramshi, that stems from the definite noun of the placename Gramsh, a small town in central-eastern Albania. Antonio Gramsci's mother belonged to a Sardinian landowning family from Sorgono (in the province of Nuoro). The senior Gramsci's financial difficulties and troubles with the police forced the family to move about through several villages in Sardinia until they finally settled in Ghilarza.

In 1898, Francesco was convicted of embezzlement and imprisoned, reducing his family to destitution. The young Antonio had to abandon schooling and work at various casual jobs until his father's release in 1904. As a boy, Gramsci suffered from health problems, particularly a malformation of the spine that stunted his growth (his adult height was less than 5 feet) and left him seriously hunchbacked. For decades, it was reported that his condition had been due to a childhood accident – specifically, having been dropped by a nanny – but more recently it has been suggested that it was due to Pott disease, a form of tuberculosis that can cause deformity of the spine. Gramsci was also plagued by various internal disorders throughout his life.

Gramsci started secondary school in Santu Lussurgiu and completed it in Cagliari, where he lodged with his elder brother Gennaro, a former soldier whose time on the mainland had made him a militant socialist. However, Gramsci's sympathies then did not lie with socialism, but rather with the grievances of impoverished Sardinian peasants and miners, whose mistreatment by the mainlanders would later deeply contribute to his intellectual growth. They perceived their neglect as a result of privileges enjoyed by the rapidly industrialising North, and they tended to turn to a growing Sardinian nationalism, brutally repressed by troops from the Italian mainland, as a response.

Turin

In 1911 Gramsci won a scholarship to study at the University of Turin, sitting the exam at the same time as Palmiro Togliatti. At Turin he read literature and took a keen interest in linguistics, which he studied under Matteo Bartoli. Gramsci was in Turin as it was going through industrialization, with the Fiat and Lancia factories recruiting workers from poorer regions. Trade unions became established, and the first industrial social conflicts started to emerge. Gramsci frequented socialist circles as well as associating with Sardinian emigrants on the Italian mainland. Both his earlier experiences in Sardinia and his environment on the mainland shaped his worldview. Gramsci joined the Italian Socialist Party in late 1913, where he would later occupy a key position and observe from Turin the Russian Revolution.

Although showing a talent for his studies, Gramsci had financial problems and poor health. Together with his growing political commitment, these led to him abandoning his education in early 1915, at age 24. By this time he had acquired an extensive knowledge of history and philosophy. At university, he had come into contact with the thought of Antonio Labriola, Rodolfo Mondolfo, Giovanni Gentile, and most importantly, Benedetto Croce, possibly the most widely respected Italian intellectual of his day. Labriola especially propounded a brand of Hegelian Marxism that he labelled "philosophy of praxis". Although Gramsci later used this phrase to escape the prison censors, his relationship with this current of thought was ambiguous throughout his life.

From 1914 onward, Gramsci's writings for socialist newspapers such as Il Grido del Popolo earned him a reputation as a notable journalist. In 1916 he became co-editor of the Piedmont edition of  Avanti!, the Socialist Party official organ. An articulate and prolific writer of political theory, Gramsci proved a formidable commentator, writing on all aspects of Turin's social and political events.

Gramsci was at this time also involved in the education and organisation of Turin workers; he spoke in public for the first time in 1916 and gave talks on topics such as Romain Rolland, the French Revolution, the Paris Commune, and the emancipation of women. In the wake of the arrest of Socialist Party leaders that followed  revolutionary riots in August 1917, Gramsci became one of Turin's leading socialists; he was elected to the party's provisional committee and also made editor of Il Grido del Popolo.

In April 1919, with Togliatti, Angelo Tasca and Umberto Terracini, Gramsci set up the weekly newspaper L'Ordine Nuovo (The New Order). In October the same year, despite being divided into various hostile factions, the Socialist Party moved by a large majority to join the Third International. Vladimir Lenin saw the L'Ordine Nuovo group as closest in orientation to the Bolsheviks, and it received his backing against the anti-parliamentary programme of the left-communist Amadeo Bordiga.

In the course of tactical debates within the party, Gramsci's group mainly stood out due to its advocacy of workers' councils, which had come into existence in Turin spontaneously during the large strikes of 1919 and 1920. For Gramsci, these councils were the proper means of enabling workers to take control of the task of organising production. Although he believed his position at this time to be in keeping with Lenin's policy of "All power to the soviets", his stance that these Italian councils were communist, rather than just one organ of political struggle against the bourgeoisie, was attacked by Bordiga for betraying a syndicalist tendency influenced by the thought of Georges Sorel and Daniel De Leon. By the time of the defeat of the Turin workers in spring 1920, Gramsci was almost alone in his defence of the councils.

In the Communist Party of Italy

The failure of the workers' councils to develop into a national movement convinced Gramsci that a Communist Party in the Leninist sense was needed. The group around L'Ordine Nuovo declaimed incessantly against the Italian Socialist Party's centrist leadership and ultimately allied with Bordiga's far larger "abstentionist" faction. On 21 January 1921, in the town of Livorno (Leghorn), the Italian Communist Party (Partito Comunista d'Italia – PCd'I) was founded. In opposition to Bordiga, Gramsci supported the Arditi del Popolo, a militant anti-fascist group which struggled against the Blackshirts.

Gramsci would be a leader of the party from its inception but was subordinate to Bordiga, whose emphasis on discipline, centralism and purity of principles dominated the party's programme until the latter lost the leadership in 1924.

In 1922, Gramsci travelled to Russia as a representative of the new party. Here, he met Julia Schucht (Yulia Apollonovna Schucht (1896-1980)), a young violinist whom he married in 1923 and with whom he had two sons, Delio (1924–1982) and Giuliano (1926–2007). Gramsci never saw his second son.

The Russian mission coincided with the advent of fascism in Italy, and Gramsci returned with instructions to foster, against the wishes of the PCd'I leadership, a united front of leftist parties against fascism. Such a front would ideally have had the PCd'I at its centre, through which Moscow would have controlled all the leftist forces, but others disputed this potential supremacy: socialists did have a certain tradition in Italy, too, while the Communist Party seemed relatively young and too radical. Many believed that an eventual coalition led by communists would have functioned too remotely from political debate, and thus would have run the risk of isolation.

In late 1922 and early 1923, Benito Mussolini's government embarked on a campaign of repression against the opposition parties, arresting most of the PCd'I leadership, including Bordiga. At the end of 1923, Gramsci travelled from Moscow to Vienna, where he tried to revive a party torn by factional strife.

In 1924 Gramsci, now recognised as head of the PCd'I, gained election as a deputy for the Veneto. He started organizing the launch of the official newspaper of the party, called L'Unità (Unity), living in Rome while his family stayed in Moscow. At its Lyon Congress in January 1926, Gramsci's theses calling for a united front to restore democracy to Italy were adopted by the party.

In 1926, Joseph Stalin's manoeuvres inside the Bolshevik party moved Gramsci to write a letter to the Comintern in which he deplored the opposition led by Leon Trotsky but also underlined some presumed faults of the leader. Togliatti, in Moscow as a representative of the party, received the letter, opened it, read it, and decided not to deliver it. This caused a difficult conflict between Gramsci and Togliatti which they never completely resolved.

Imprisonment and death

On 9 November 1926, the Fascist government enacted a new wave of emergency laws, taking as a pretext an alleged attempt on Mussolini's life that had occurred several days earlier. The fascist police arrested Gramsci, despite his parliamentary immunity, and brought him to the Roman prison Regina Coeli.

At his trial, Gramsci's prosecutor stated, "For twenty years we must stop this brain from functioning". He received an immediate sentence of five years in confinement on the island of Ustica and the following year he received a sentence of 20 years' imprisonment in Turi, near Bari.

Over 11 years in prison, his health deteriorated: "His teeth fell out, his digestive system collapsed so that he could not eat solid food... he had convulsions when he vomited blood and suffered headaches so violent that he beat his head against the walls of his cell."

An international campaign, organised by Piero Sraffa at Cambridge University and Gramsci's sister-in-law Tatiana, was mounted to demand Gramsci's release. In 1933 he was moved from the prison at Turi to a clinic at Formia, but was still being denied adequate medical attention. Two years later he was moved to the Quisisana clinic in Rome. He was due for release on 21 April 1937 and planned to retire to Sardinia for convalescence, but a combination of arteriosclerosis, pulmonary tuberculosis, high blood pressure, angina, gout, and acute gastric disorders meant that he was too ill to move. Gramsci died on 27 April 1937, at the age of 46. His ashes are buried in the Cimitero Acattolico in Rome.  By moving Gramsci from prison to hospital when he became very ill, the Mussolini regime was attempting to avoid the accusation that it was his incarceration that caused his death.  Nevertheless, his death was linked directly to prison conditions. Gramsci's grandson, Antonio Jr., speculated that the Stalinist regime could have been active in preventing Gramsci's release from prison due to his perceived Trotskyist sympathies.

Philosophical work

Gramsci was one of the most influential Marxist thinkers of the 20th century, and a particularly key thinker in the development of Western Marxism. He wrote more than 30 notebooks and 3,000 pages of history and analysis during his imprisonment. These writings, known as the Prison Notebooks, contain Gramsci's tracing of Italian history and nationalism, as well as some ideas in Marxist theory, critical theory and educational theory associated with his name, such as:

Cultural hegemony as a means of maintaining and legitimising the capitalist state
The need for popular workers' education to encourage development of intellectuals from the working-class
An analysis of the modern capitalist state that distinguishes between political society, which dominates directly and coercively, and civil society, where leadership is constituted through consent
Absolute historicism
A critique of economic determinism that opposes fatalistic interpretations of Marxism
A critique of philosophical materialism

Hegemony

Hegemony was a term previously used by Marxists such as Vladimir Lenin to denote the political leadership of the working-class in a democratic revolution. Gramsci greatly expanded this concept, developing an acute analysis of how the ruling capitalist class – the bourgeoisie – establishes and maintains its control.

Orthodox Marxism had predicted that socialist revolution was inevitable in capitalist societies. By the early 20th century, no such revolution had occurred in the most advanced nations. Rather, capitalism seemed more entrenched than ever. Capitalism, Gramsci suggested, maintained control not just through violence and political and economic coercion, but also through ideology. The bourgeoisie developed a hegemonic culture, which propagated its own values and norms so that they became the "common sense" values of all. People in the working-class (and other classes) identified their own good with the good of the bourgeoisie and helped to maintain the status quo rather than revolting.

To counter the notion that bourgeois values represented natural or normal values for society, the working-class needed to develop a culture of its own. Lenin held that culture was ancillary to political objectives, but for Gramsci, it was fundamental to the attainment of power that cultural hegemony be achieved first. In Gramsci's view, a class cannot dominate in modern conditions by merely advancing its own narrow economic interests; neither can it dominate purely through force and coercion. Rather, it must exert intellectual and moral leadership, and make alliances and compromises with a variety of forces. Gramsci calls this union of social forces a "historic bloc", taking a term from Georges Sorel. This bloc forms the basis of consent to a certain social order, which produces and re-produces the hegemony of the dominant class through a nexus of institutions, social relations, and ideas. In this way, Gramsci's theory emphasized the importance of the political and ideological superstructure in both maintaining and fracturing relations of the economic base.

Gramsci stated that bourgeois cultural values were tied to folklore, popular culture and religion, and therefore much of his analysis of hegemonic culture is aimed at these. He was also impressed by the influence that the Catholic Church had and the care it had taken to prevent an excessive gap developing between the religion of the learned and that of the less educated. Gramsci saw Marxism as a marriage of the purely intellectual critique of religion found in Renaissance humanism and the elements of the Reformation that had appealed to the masses. For Gramsci, Marxism could supersede religion only if it met people's spiritual needs, and to do so people would have to think of it as an expression of their own experience.

Intellectuals and education
Gramsci gave much thought to the role of intellectuals in society. He stated that all men are intellectuals, in that all have intellectual and rational faculties, but not all men have the social function of intellectuals. He saw modern intellectuals not as talkers, but as practical-minded directors and organisers who produced hegemony through ideological apparatuses such as education and the media. Furthermore, he distinguished between a traditional intelligentsia which sees itself (wrongly) as a class apart from society, and the thinking groups which every class produces from its own ranks "organically". Such "organic" intellectuals do not simply describe social life in accordance with scientific rules, but instead articulate, through the language of culture, the feelings and experiences which the masses could not express for themselves. To Gramsci, it was the duty of organic intellectuals to speak to the obscured precepts of folk wisdom, or common sense (senso comune), of their respective political spheres. These intellectuals would represent excluded social groups of a society, what Gramsci referred to as the subaltern.

In line with Gramsci's theories of hegemonic power, he argued that capitalist power needed to be challenged by building a counter-hegemony. By this he meant that, as part of the war of position, the organic intellectuals and others within the working-class, need to develop alternative values and an alternative ideology in contrast to bourgeois ideology. He argued that the reason this had not needed to happen in Russia was because the Russian ruling class did not have genuine hegemonic power. So the Bolsheviks were able to carry out a war of manoeuvre (the 1917 revolution) relatively easily, because ruling-class hegemony had never been fully achieved. He believed that a final war of manoeuvre was only possible, in the developed and advanced capitalist societies, when the war of position had been won by the organic intellectuals and the working-class building a counter-hegemony.

His ideas about an education system for this purpose correspond with the notion of critical pedagogy and popular education as theorized and practised in later decades by Paulo Freire in Brazil, and have much in common with the thought of Frantz Fanon. For this reason, partisans of adult and popular education consider Gramsci's writings and ideas important to this day.

State and civil society

Gramsci's theory of hegemony is tied to his conception of the capitalist state. Gramsci does not understand the state in the narrow sense of the government. Instead, he divides it between political society (the police, the army, legal system, etc.) – the arena of political institutions and legal constitutional control – and civil society (the family, the education system, trade unions, etc.) – commonly seen as the private or non-state sphere, which mediates between the state and the economy. However, he stresses that the division is purely conceptual and that the two often overlap in reality. Gramsci claims the capitalist state rules through force plus consent: political society is the realm of force and civil society is the realm of consent.

Gramsci proffers that under modern capitalism the bourgeoisie can maintain its economic control by allowing certain demands made by trade unions and mass political parties within civil society to be met by the political sphere. Thus, the bourgeoisie engages in passive revolution by going beyond its immediate economic interests and allowing the forms of its hegemony to change. Gramsci posits that movements such as reformism and fascism, as well as the scientific management and assembly line methods of Frederick Taylor and Henry Ford respectively, are examples of this.

Drawing from Machiavelli, he argues that The Modern Prince – the revolutionary party – is the force that will allow the working-class to develop organic intellectuals and an alternative hegemony within civil society. For Gramsci, the complex nature of modern civil society means that a war of position, carried out by revolutionaries through political agitation, the trade unions, advancement of proletarian culture, and other ways to create an opposing civil society was necessary alongside a war of manoeuvre – a direct revolution – in order to have a successful revolution without danger of a counter-revolution or degeneration.

Despite his claim that the lines between the two may be blurred, Gramsci rejects the state-worship that results from equating political society with civil society, as was done by the Jacobins and Fascists. He believes the proletariat's historical task is to create a "regulated society", where political society is diminished and civil society is expanded. He defines the "withering away of the state" as the full development of civil society's ability to regulate itself.

Historicism
Like the early Marx, Gramsci was an emphatic proponent of historicism. In Gramsci's view, all meaning derives from the relation between human practical activity (or praxis) and the objective historical and social processes of which it is a part. Ideas cannot be understood outside their social and historical context, apart from their function and origin. The concepts by which we organise our knowledge of the world do not derive primarily from our relation to  objects, but rather from the social relations between the users of those concepts. As a result, there is no such thing as an unchanging human nature, but only historically variable social relationships. Furthermore, philosophy and science do not reflect a reality independent of man. Rather, a theory can be said to be true when, in any given historical situation, it expresses the real developmental trend of that situation.

For the majority of Marxists, truth was truth no matter when and where it was known, and scientific knowledge (which included Marxism) accumulated historically as the advance of truth in this everyday sense. In this view, Marxism (or the Marxist theory of history and economics) did not belong to the illusory realm of the superstructure because it is a science. In contrast, Gramsci believed Marxism was true in a socially pragmatic sense: by articulating the class consciousness of the proletariat, Marxism expressed the truth of its times better than any other theory. This anti-scientistic and anti-positivist stance was indebted to the influence of Benedetto Croce. However, it should be underlined that Gramsci's absolute historicism broke with Croce's tendency to secure a metaphysical synthesis in historical destiny. Although Gramsci repudiates the charge, his historical account of truth has been criticised as a form of relativism.

Critique of "economism"

In a pre-prison article titled "The Revolution against ", Gramsci wrote that the October Revolution in Russia had invalidated the idea that socialist revolution had to await the full development of capitalist forces of production. This reflected his view that Marxism was not a determinist philosophy. The principle of the causal primacy of the forces of production was a misconception of Marxism. Both economic changes and cultural changes are expressions of a basic historical process, and it is difficult to say which sphere has primacy over the other. 

The belief from the earliest years of the workers' movement that it would inevitably triumph due to "historical laws" was a product of the historical circumstances of an oppressed class restricted mainly to defensive action. This fatalistic doctrine must be abandoned as a hindrance once the working-class becomes able to take the initiative. Because Marxism is a philosophy of praxis, it cannot rely on unseen historical laws as the agents of social change. History is defined by human praxis and therefore includes human will. Nonetheless, will-power cannot achieve anything it likes in any given situation: when the consciousness of the working-class reaches the stage of development necessary for action, it will encounter historical circumstances that cannot be arbitrarily altered. It is not predetermined by historical inevitability as to which of several possible developments will take place as a result.

His critique of economism also extended to that practised by the syndicalists of the Italian trade unions. He believed that many trade unionists had settled for a reformist, gradualist approach in that they had refused to struggle on the political front in addition to the economic front. For Gramsci, much as the ruling class can look beyond its own immediate economic interests to reorganise the forms of its own hegemony, so must the working-class present its own interests as congruous with the universal advancement of society. While Gramsci envisioned the trade unions as one organ of a counter-hegemonic force in a capitalist society, the trade union leaders simply saw these organizations as a means to improve conditions within the existing structure. Gramsci referred to the views of these trade unionists as vulgar economism, which he equated to covert reformism and even liberalism.

Critique of materialism

By virtue of his belief that human history and collective praxis determine whether any philosophical question is meaningful or not, Gramsci's views run contrary to the metaphysical materialism and copy theory of perception advanced by Friedrich Engels, and Lenin, though he does not explicitly state this. For Gramsci, Marxism does not deal with a reality that exists in and for itself, independent of humanity. The concept of an objective universe outside of human history and human praxis was analogous to belief in God. Gramsci defined objectivity in terms of a universal intersubjectivity to be established in a future communist society. Natural history was thus only meaningful in relation to human history. In his view philosophical materialism resulted from a lack of critical thought, and could not be said to oppose religious dogma and superstition. Despite this, Gramsci resigned himself to the existence of this arguably cruder form of Marxism. Marxism was a philosophy for the proletariat, a subaltern class, and thus could often only be expressed in the form of popular superstition and common sense. Nonetheless, it was necessary to effectively challenge the ideologies of the educated classes, and to do so Marxists must present their philosophy in a more sophisticated guise, and attempt to genuinely understand their opponents' views.

Influence

Gramsci's thought emanates from the organized left, but he has also become an important figure in current academic discussions within cultural studies and critical theory. Political theorists from the center and the right have also found insight in his concepts; his idea of hegemony, for example, has become widely cited. His influence is particularly strong in contemporary political science . His work also heavily influenced intellectual discourse on popular culture and scholarly popular culture studies in which many have found the potential for political or ideological resistance to dominant government and business interests.

His critics charge him with fostering a notion of power struggle through ideas. They find the Gramscian approach to philosophical analysis, reflected in current academic controversies, to be in conflict with open-ended, liberal inquiry grounded in apolitical readings of the classics of Western culture.

As a socialist, Gramsci's legacy has been disputed. Togliatti, who led the party (renamed as Italian Communist Party, PCI) after World War II and whose gradualist approach was a forerunner to Eurocommunism, claimed that the PCI's practices during this period were congruent with Gramscian thought. It is speculated that he would likely have been expelled from his Party if his true views had been known, particularly his growing hostility to Stalin.

A 2021 biography of Gramsci argues that Gramsci erred in his parliamentary resistance to fascism.  Elected to parliament by the Communist Party of Italy, Gramsci was allowed to make only one parliamentary speech on 16 May 1925 before he was arrested. In that speech and the debate that followed, Gramsci defended the use of violence by the left, including leftist violence emerging in Russia because he believed it to be better than fascist violence. For Gramsci, this was because "we represent the majority and will defeat you while you (the fascists) represent the minority and will disappear." Gramsci would have been far more effective had he eschewed violence by any party and argued, instead, for the rule of law and a constitutional order.  He could have begun his argument by condemning the murder of Giacomo Matteoti who had already called for the rule of law and been murdered by the fascists for that position.  That murder produced a crisis for the fascist regime which Gramsci could have exploited. Frétigné also argues that Gramsci and the Socialists more generally were naïve in their assessment of the fascists and as a result underestimated the brutality of which the regime was capable.

In popular culture

 Occupations – Gramsci is a central character in Trevor Griffiths's 1970 play Occupations about workers taking over car factories in Turin in 1920.
 Gramsci – Everything That Concerns People – John Sessions plays Gramsci in the 1984 Channel 4 film. Brian Cox narrates.
 Gramsci Monument – a project by Thomas Hirschhorn in honour of Gramsci; built in a courtyard of the Forest Houses housing projects in The Bronx, New York by 15 residents in 2013. It included displays and artefacts from Gramsci's life in addition to lectures on Gramsci.
 Scritti Politti – British post-punk band, named in honour of Gramsci. The name is a rough Italian translation of political scripts/writings. 
 Piazza Gramsci – a central square, named after Gramsci in Siena in Tuscany.
 Via Antonio Gramsci, the main road to the Central Train Station in Cefalù, on the northern coast of Sicily, Italy is named after Gramsci.
 Additional streets named after Gramsci are found in the cities of Naples, Turin, Lascari, Pollina, Collesano, Volterra, Palermo and Belgrade.
 A major road going through the lower portion of Genoa, along the coast, is named after Gramsci.
 In an episode of the comedy Spaced, Gramsci was the name of a dog that was trained to attack the rich. The dog was owned by Minty, a friend of Bilbo Bagshot (Bill Bailey). One day Minty won the lottery and was attacked by Gramsci.
 In the Florestano Vancini film The Assassination of Matteotti (1973), Gramsci is played by Riccardo Cucciolla, same as in the Lino Del Fra's Antonio Gramsci: The Days of Prison (1977).
 Antonio Gramsci Battalion –  Italian soldiers in Albania, founded the battalion Antonio Gramsci, after capitulation of Italy and continued to fight against German forces until the liberation of Albania.

Bibliography

Collections
 Pre-Prison Writings (Cambridge University Press)
 The Prison Notebooks (three volumes) (Columbia University Press)
 Selections from the Prison Notebooks (International Publishers)

Essays
 Newspapers and the Workers (1916)
 Men or machines? (1916)
 One Year of History (1918)

See also
Subaltern Studies
Subaltern (postcolonialism)
Reformism
Articulation (sociology)
Risorgimento
Praxis School
Liberation theology
Antonio Gramsci Battalion

References

Cited sources

 .
 
 

 
 
 
 .

Further reading

 Francesco Aqueci, Il Gramsci di un nuovo inizio,  Quaderno 12, Supplemento al n. 19 (settembre-dicembre 2018) di «AGON», Rivista Internazionale di Studi Culturali, Linguistici e Letterari, pp. 223.

 Dainotto, Roberto M. and Fredric Jameson, eds. Gramsci in the World (Duke University Press, 2020) online review
 Davidson, Alastair (2018). Antonio Gramsci: Towards an Intellectual Biography [2016]. Chicago: Haymarket Books.
Femia, Joseph (1981) Gramsci's Political Thought – Hegemony, Consciousness and the Revolutionary Process. Oxford. .
Fonseca, Marco (2016). Gramsci's Critique of Civil Society. Towards a New Concept of Hegemony. Routledge. 

Greaves, Nigel (2009) Gramsci's Marxism: Reclaiming a Philosophy of History and Politics. Leicester. .
 Harman Chris Gramsci, the Prison Notebooks and Philosophy
 Henderson, Hamish (1987), "Antonio Gramsci", in Ross, Raymond J. (ed.), Cencrastus No. 28, Winter 87/88, pp. 22 – 26, 

 

McNally, Mark (ed.) (2015) Antonio Gramsci. Basingstoke: Palgrave MacMillan. .

Pastore, Gerardo (2011), Antonio Gramsci. Questione sociale e questione sociologica. Livorno: Belforte. .

Thomas, Peter (2009) The Gramscian Moment, Philosophy, Hegemony and Marxism. Leiden/Boston. .

External links

 Monumento Casa natale di Antonio Gramsci, Ales, Sardinia

Institutes
 The International Gramsci Society
 Fondazione Instituto Gramsci
 Associazione Casa Natale Antonio Gramsci
  Antonio Gramsci, 1891–1937

Texts by Gramsci
 Gramsci's writings at the Marxists Internet Archive Library
 journal.telospress.com Gramsci: "Notes on Language" – Telos

Articles on Gramsci
 Articles on Gramsci at journal.telospress.com
 Trudell, Megan; et al.: "Gramsci's revolutionary legacy", International Socialism 2007, issue 117
 Martin, James: Antonio Gramsci, Stanford Encyclopedia of Philosophy. 13 January 2023.
 Robaina, Roberto: "Gramsci and revolution: a necessary clarification", International Socialism
 Jakopovich, Dan: "Revolution and the Party in Gramsci's Thought: A Modern Application"
  Gramsci's contribution to the field of adult and popular education – www.infed.org
 "The life and work of Antonio Gramsci" – www.theory.org.uk (Archived)
 Hedges, Chris: "Antonio Gramsci and the Battle Against Fascism" – Truthdig. 4 June 2017
 Jessop, Bob: Lectures on Gramsci (Four sessions with audio).

 
1891 births
1937 deaths
20th-century Italian philosophers
20th-century Italian politicians
Arbëreshë people
Burials in the Protestant Cemetery, Rome
Continental philosophers
Executive Committee of the Communist International
Italian anti-capitalists
Italian anti-fascists
Italian Aventinian secessionists
Italian Communist Party politicians
Italian feminists
Italian male journalists
Italian Marxists
Italian newspaper editors
Italian newspaper founders
Italian people of Albanian descent
Italian people of Arbëreshë descent
Italian people who died in prison custody
Italian political philosophers
Italian socialists
Italian Socialist Party politicians
Journalists who died while in prison
Marxist humanists
Italian Marxist journalists
Marxist theorists
Italian Marxist writers
People from the Province of Oristano
Prisoners who died in Italian detention
University of Turin alumni
Viareggio Prize winners
Italian letter writers
20th-century letter writers